Raynham is a civil parish in the English county of Norfolk, consisting of the villages of South, East and West Raynham.
For the purposes of local government, it falls within the district of North Norfolk.

The name 'Raynham' means 'Regna's homestead/village' or 'Regna's hemmed-in land'.

Governance
Raynham is part of the electoral ward called The Raynhams. This ward stretches north to Tattersett with a total population at the 2011 Census of 2,521.

Notes 

North Norfolk
Civil parishes in Norfolk